Exercism is an online, open-source, free coding platform that offers code practice and mentorship on 62 different programming languages.

History

Software developer Katrina Owen created Exercism while she was teaching programming at Jumpstart Labs. The platform was developed as an internal tool to solve the problem of her own students not receiving feedback on the coding problems they were practicing. Katrina put the site publicly online and found that people were sharing it with their friends, practicing together and giving each other feedback. Within 12 months, the site had organically grown to see over 6,000 users had submitted code or feedback, and hundreds of volunteers contribute to the languages or tooling on the platform.

In July 2018, the site was relaunched with a new design and centred around a formal mentoring mode.

Product

The website differs from other coding platforms by requiring students to download exercises through a command line client, solve the code on their own computers then submit the solution for feedback, at which point they can also view other's solutions to the same problem.

Exercism has tracks for 62 different programming languages. including ABAP, C, C#, C++, CoffeeScript, Elm, Erlang, F#, Go, Java, JavaScript, Julia, Kotlin, Objective-C, PHP, Python, Raku, Ruby, Rust, Scala, Swift and Delphi.

In 2023, the site launched a "12 in 23" challenge for users to learn the basics of 12 different languages - one per month in 2023.

Open source

The Exercism codebase is open source, consisting of over 50 repositories, containing website code, API code, command-line code and over 40 stand-alone repositories for different language tracks.  Exercism has 3,500 contributors and 11,500 mentors.

References

Open-source cloud applications
Free software
Online services
Virtual learning environments
Open educational resources